Mi plačemo iza tamnih naočara (trans. We Cry Behind Dark Glasses) is the first and only studio album by the Yugoslav post-punk/darkwave band Dobri Isak, released in 1984.

The album was originally released on compact cassette and with a limited printing of a hundred copies only, rapidly sold out and became a collector's item. In 2009 the album was re-released by PMK Records with seven bonus tracks of unreleased material, bringing to the band new attention from the audience and recognition from the music critics in Serbia and other former Yugoslav republics.

Background
Formed in Niš in 1983, Dobri Isak recorded their only studio album, Mi plačemo iza tamnih naočara, in 1984. The album was released by the Niš Students' Cultural Center (SKS), being the first release of the Center's Studentkult production, which issued an array of musical and literary releases. The album, released on compact cassette only and printed in a limited number of 100 copies, had been distributed by the Ljubljana Students' Cultural Center, and rapidly sold out. The band disbanded in 1986, their album enjoying cult status during the following decades.

Reissue
In 2009 the album was re-released by PMK Records with seven bonus tracks of unreleased material, bringing to the band new attention from the audience and recognition from music critics in Serbia and other former Yugoslav republics. In June 2010 PMK Records released the 150 copies limited edition reissue of the album, featuring an alternate album cover, with the band logo written in red, and a black CD. In 2015 the album was released on vinyl record for the first time by the same record label. During the same year the label issued the 100 copies limited vinyl edition of the album on transparent red vinyl.

Album cover
The original album cover features an image of fictional comic book superhero The Phantom.

Track listing 
All tracks written by Dobri Isak except "Feniks", by Arnold Layne (N. Cvetičanin, D. Krstović, D. Marinković, M. Manić)

Ulična strana A (Street Side A)

Sobna strana B (Room Side B)

CD reissue bonus tracks

Credits

Dobri Isak 
 Predrag Cvetičanin "Frodo" - guitar, vocals
 Miloš Miladinović "Pacov" - bass guitar, backing vocals
 Saša Marković "Markiz" - drums, backing vocals
 Saša Marković "Stipsa" - album producer

Additional personnel 
 Nenad Cvetičanin (guitar, backing vocals on the recordings made at Markiz's room)
 Dejan Krasić (guitar on the recordings made at Radio Niš)

Cover versions 
 In 1994, on the album Land Ho!, Nenad Cvetičanin's band Arnold Layne & Alhemija, covered the song "Mi plačemo iza tamnih naočara".
 In 2010, Croatian rock band Mlijeko covered "Mi plačemo iza tamnih naočara" on their self-titled debut album.

References 

 Mi plačemo iza tamnih naočara at Discogs

External links
 Mi plačemo iza tamnih naočara at Discogs

Dobri Isak albums
1984 debut albums